Chahardangeh District is in Hurand County, East Azerbaijan province, Iran. At the 2006 National Census, its population (as the former Chahardangeh Rural District in Ahar County), was 8,241 in 1,602 households. The following census in 2011 counted 7,612 people in 1,951 households. At the latest census in 2016, the district had 7,693 inhabitants in 2,254 households.

After the census, Hurand District was separated from Ahar County to establish Hurand County and the rural district became a district divided into two rural districts and no cities as follows:

References 

Districts of East Azerbaijan Province

Populated places in East Azerbaijan Province

fa:بخش چهاردانگه (هوراند)